Senator Winslow may refer to:

Bradley Winslow (1831–1914), New York State Senate
Norris Winslow (1834–1900), New York State Senate
Warren Winslow (1810–1862), North Carolina State Senate